Oscar Ewolo (born 9 October 1978) is a Congolese former professional footballer who played as a midfielder. He spent his career in France.

Career
Ewolo was born in Brazzaville. He signed for Brest from FC Lorient on 15 July 2009. and in July 2012, joined Ligue 2 team Stade Lavallois on a one-year contract.

Personal life
Ewolo is a former footballer and also a pastor.
He is a Christian, and has spoken about his faith in the documentary "The Prize: Chasing the Dream" along with Kaká.

Career statistics

International
Source:

References

External links
 
 

Living people
1978 births
Sportspeople from Brazzaville
Association football midfielders
Republic of the Congo footballers
Republic of the Congo expatriate footballers
Republic of the Congo international footballers
2000 African Cup of Nations players
Amiens SC players
FC Lorient players
Stade Brestois 29 players
Stade Lavallois players
Ligue 1 players
Ligue 2 players
Expatriate footballers in France
Republic of the Congo expatriate sportspeople in France
Republic of the Congo Christians